David Thoday FRS (5 May 1883 – 30 March 1964) was a  botanist.

Career
Thoday was Harry Bolus professor of botany, University of Cape Town and later professor at the University College of North Wales 1923–1949.  As a botanist, his work is denoted by the author abbreviation Thoday when citing a botanical name.

Awards and honours
He was elected a Fellow of the Royal Society in 1942. His nomination reads

Personal life
His son was the geneticist John Thoday.

References

Botanists with author abbreviations
1883 births
1964 deaths
Fellows of the Royal Society
Academic staff of the University of Cape Town
Academics of Bangor University